Charles Caulker (died 1842) was chief of the Bumpe Chiefdom from 1832 to 1842, in the colony of Sierra Leone.

Also known as Ba Charley, he had succeeded his brother Thomas Kon Tham in 1832.

References

1842 deaths
Political office-holders in Sierra Leone